"Tout oublier" is a song by Belgian artists Angèle and Roméo Elvis. The song peaked at number one on the French Singles Chart. The song broke Stromae's record for weeks at the top of the Belgian singles charts. The song also won several Belgian and French awards.

Awards and nominations

Charts

Weekly charts

Year-end charts

Certifications

References

2018 singles
2018 songs
SNEP Top Singles number-one singles
Ultratop 50 Singles (Wallonia) number-one singles
Angèle (singer) songs